Siccia is a genus of moths in the family Erebidae. The genus was erected by Francis Walker in 1854.

Species
 Siccia adiaphora 
 Siccia anserina 
 Siccia arabica 
 Siccia atriguttata 
 Siccia bicolorata 
 Siccia buettikeri 
 Siccia butvilai 
 Siccia caffra 
 Siccia chogoriae 
 Siccia conformis 
 Siccia cretata 
 Siccia decolorata 
 Siccia dudai 
 Siccia duodecimpunctata 
 Siccia eberti 
 Siccia elgona 
 Siccia grossagranularis 
 Siccia gypsia 
 Siccia guttulosana 
 Siccia margopuncta 
 Siccia melanospila 
 Siccia microsticta 
 Siccia minima 
 Siccia nigropunctana 
 Siccia nilgirica 
 Siccia obscura 
 Siccia orbiculata 
 Siccia overlaeti 
 Siccia pallens 
 Siccia pallidata 
 Siccia paucipuncta 
 Siccia punctipennis 
 Siccia pustulata 
 Siccia quilimania 
 Siccia rarita 
 Siccia sordida 
 Siccia stictica 
 Siccia tau 
 Siccia ursulae 
 Siccia yvonneae

References
 Ivinskis, P. & Saldaitis, A. (2008). "New data on tiger moths of the genus Siccia (Lepidoptera, Arctiidae) with descriptions of two new species." Acta zoologica Lituanica 18(4): 256–260.
 Kühne, L. (2007). Esperiana Buchreihe zur Entomologie Memoir 3: 353–394.

 

Nudariina
Moth genera